The Titel Chapter was a collegiate chapter, established in the late , in the Kingdom of Hungary. It was dedicated to the Holy Wisdom.

Establishment 

Duke Lampertthe younger brother of Ladislaus I of Hungaryestablished the collegiate chapter at Titel (now in Serbia) between 1077 and 1095. It was dedicated to the Holy Wisdom.

References

Sources

Collegiate Chapters in Hungary